The Cardinal is a 1963 American film.

The Cardinal may also refer to:

The Cardinal (play), a 1641 James Shirley play
The Cardinal (1901 play) a 1901 play by Louis N. Parker
The Cardinal (1936 film), a 1936 British film
The Cardinal, a novel by Henry Morton Robinson, the basis for the 1963 film

See also
Cardinal (disambiguation)